Gerhard Egger (13 October 1908 – 28 April 1945) was an Austrian equestrian. He competed in two events at the 1936 Summer Olympics.

References

1908 births
1945 deaths
Austrian male equestrians
Olympic equestrians of Austria
Equestrians at the 1936 Summer Olympics
Place of birth missing